Suwaibidu Galadima (born 31 August 1992) is a Nigerian male disability track and field athlete who competes in the 100 metres in the T46 category. His right arm is amputated below the elbow. He was the gold medallist in the T47 category at the 2018 Commonwealth Games.

He won a sprint double in the 100 m and 200 metres at the 2011 All-Africa Games. He represented his country in both events at the 2012 Summer Paralympics and placed fourth in the 100 m.

International competitions

References

Living people
1992 births
People from Kaduna State
Nigerian male sprinters
Sprinters with limb difference
Paralympic athletes of Nigeria
Athletes (track and field) at the 2012 Summer Paralympics
Commonwealth Games gold medallists for Nigeria
Commonwealth Games medallists in athletics
Athletes (track and field) at the 2018 Commonwealth Games
African Games gold medalists for Nigeria
African Games medalists in athletics (track and field)
Athletes (track and field) at the 2011 All-Africa Games
Nigerian amputees
20th-century Nigerian people
21st-century Nigerian people
Paralympic sprinters
Medallists at the 2018 Commonwealth Games